Abdellah Jlaidi (born 13 May 1981) is a Moroccan footballer. He usually plays as midfielder for JS Massira.

Jlaidi was born in Marrakech and began playing football with the youth side of local club Kawkab Marrakech. He made his debut in the Moroccan Botola against Hassania Agadir during the 1999–2000 season. He moved to Raja Casablanca in 2007.

References

1981 births
Living people
Moroccan footballers
Raja CA players
Sportspeople from Marrakesh
Kawkab Marrakech players
Association football midfielders